The 2020 Euro Hockey League Women was supposed to be the first edition of the Euro Hockey League Women, Europe's premier women's club field hockey tournament, organized by the European Hockey Federation. It was originally scheduled to be held at the Wagener Stadium in Amstelveen, Netherlands from 9 to 13 April 2020. 

Due to the COVID-19 pandemic in Europe the tournament was put on hold in March 2020. On 12 May 2020, it was announced that the tournament was postponed to October 2020. The tournament was officially cancelled on 14 August 2020.

Association team allocation
A total of 8 teams from 6 of the 45 EHF member associations would participate in the 2020 EHL Women. The association rankings based on the EHL country coefficients was used to determine the number of participating teams for each association:
 Associations 1–2 each had two teams qualify.
 Associations 3–6 each had one team qualify.

Association ranking
For the 2020 Euro Hockey League Women, the associations were allocated places according to their 2019 EHCC country coefficients, which takes into account their performance in the EuroHockey Club Cup and the EuroHockey Club Trophy from 2016–17 to 2018–19.

Teams
  Amsterdam
  Den Bosch
  Club an der Alster
  UHC Hamburg
  Club de Campo
  Surbiton
  Pegasus
  Minsk

See also
 2019–20 Euro Hockey League
 2020 Women's EuroHockey Indoor Club Cup

References

External links
 

2020
Euro Hockey League Women
Euro Hockey League Women
Euro Hockey League Women